Andrei Sergeyevich Danilov (born 2 January 1974) is a Russian professional football manager and a former player.

Playing career
He made his professional debut in the Russian Second Division in 1992 for FC Gornyak Kachkanar. He played 6 games in the UEFA Intertoto Cup 1996 for FC Uralmash Yekaterinburg.

References

1974 births
People from Sverdlovsk Oblast
Living people
Russian footballers
Association football midfielders
Russian Premier League players
FC Ural Yekaterinburg players
FC Lada-Tolyatti players
FC Sokol Saratov players
FC Irtysh Omsk players
Russian football managers
FC Arsenal Tula players
FC Yenisey Krasnoyarsk players
FC Novokuznetsk players
FC Uralets Nizhny Tagil players
FC Spartak Nizhny Novgorod players
Sportspeople from Sverdlovsk Oblast